UCCP is an abbreviation, and can refer to the following:
United Church of Christ in the Philippines
 Original name for University College of Citizenship and Public Service, currently Jonathan M. Tisch College of Citizenship and Public Service
 Unified Conference Control Protocol (UCCP) is a web-based protocol.